Dorothy Margaret Watts (1910–1990), known professionally as Dodo Watts, was a British stage and film actress. She played Fay Eaton in the 1929 Broadway version of Ian Hay's play The Middle Watch, and reprised her role in the 1930 British film version the following year. When her career wound down, she became a business woman, owning a successful millinery firm in London's West End. She was later a casting director, and head of casting for ABC Weekend TV (later Thames Television); and largely responsible for casting Diana Rigg in the role of Emma Peel in The Avengers TV series. She later became a theatrical agent.

Partial filmography
 Confessions (1925)
 Auld Lang Syne (1929)
 The School for Scandal (1930)
 Almost a Honeymoon (1930)
 The Man from Chicago (1930)
 The Middle Watch (1930)
 Uneasy Virtue (1931)
 Her Night Out (1932)
 Impromptu (1932)
 Dora (1933)
 Hundred to One (1933)
 Little Fella (1933)
 Sing Along with Me (1952)

References

External links
 

1910 births
1990 deaths
British film actresses
Actresses from London
20th-century British actresses
British casting directors
Women casting directors
20th-century English women
20th-century English people